Badu Island Airport  is an airport on Badu Island, Queensland, Australia.

See also
 List of airports in Queensland

References

Airports in Queensland